Cordilura is a genus of dung flies in the family Scathophagidae. There are more than 90 described species in Cordilura.

Species
These 97 species belong to the genus Cordilura:

 Cordilura aberrans (Becker, 1894)
 Cordilura adrogans Cresson, 1918
 Cordilura aea (Walker, 1849)
 Cordilura aemula (Collin, 1958)
 Cordilura alberta (Curran, 1927)
 Cordilura albicoxa James, 1955
 Cordilura albipes Fallen, 1819
 Cordilura albofasciata (Gimmerthal, 1846)
 Cordilura amurensis Ozerov, 2007
 Cordilura angustifrons Loew, 1863
 Cordilura aricioides (Zetterstedt, 1855)
 Cordilura atrata Zetterstedt, 1846
 Cordilura atripennis James, 1955
 Cordilura banski (Malloch, 1923)
 Cordilura bezzii (Sack, 1937)
 Cordilura bicoloripes Ozerov, 1997
 Cordilura carbonaria (Walker, 1849)
 Cordilura ciliata (Meigen, 1826)
 Cordilura ciliatipes James, 1955
 Cordilura confusa Loew, 1863
 Cordilura connexa (Robineau-Desvoidy, 1830)
 Cordilura criddlei Curran, 1929
 Cordilura cuspidata Sasakawa, 1986
 Cordilura deceptiva Malloch, 1923
 Cordilura dimidiata (Cresson, 1918)
 Cordilura emarginata (Malloch, 1923)
 Cordilura fasciventris Curran, 1927
 Cordilura femoralis Sun, 1993
 Cordilura filipes (Robineau-Desvoidy, 1830)
 Cordilura flava (Wiedemann, 1830)
 Cordilura flavovenosa (Becker, 1894)
 Cordilura fulva (Robineau-Desvoidy, 1830)
 Cordilura fulvifrons Ozerov, 1997
 Cordilura fulvipes (Meigen, 1838)
 Cordilura fuscipes Zetterstedt, 1838
 Cordilura fuscitibia Rondani, 1867
 Cordilura gagatina Loew, 1869
 Cordilura glabra Loew, 1869
 Cordilura gracilipes Loew, 1869
 Cordilura hyalinipennis (Ringdahl, 1936)
 Cordilura impudica (Rondani, 1867)
 Cordilura incisa (Meigen, 1838)
 Cordilura intermedia (Curran, 1927)
 Cordilura kakaberrans Ozerov, 1997
 Cordilura krocha Ozerov, 2007
 Cordilura laterillii (Robineau-Desvoidy, 1830)
 Cordilura latifrons Loew, 1869
 Cordilura loewi James, 1955
 Cordilura luteola Malloch, 1924
 Cordilura marginata (Malloch, 1931)
 Cordilura marginipennis (Gimmerthal, 1847)
 Cordilura munda Loew, 1869
 Cordilura nartshukae Ozerov & Krivosheina
 Cordilura nigra (Robineau-Desvoidy, 1830)
 Cordilura nigrifrons Sun, 1993
 Cordilura nigripila (Zetterstedt, 1860)
 Cordilura nigriseta (Rondani, 1867)
 Cordilura nubecula Sasakawa, 1986
 Cordilura ontario Curran, 1929
 Cordilura passiva Curran, 1929
 Cordilura picipes (Meigen, 1826)
 Cordilura picticornis Loew, 1864
 Cordilura pilosella (Coquillett, 1898)
 Cordilura pleuritica Loew, 1863
 Cordilura polita (Coquillett, 1898)
 Cordilura praeusta Loew, 1864
 Cordilura proboscidea Zetterstedt, 1838
 Cordilura pubera (Linnaeus, 1758)
 Cordilura pudica Meigen, 1826
 Cordilura qualis (Say, 1829)
 Cordilura remmi Elberg, 1972
 Cordilura remota Ozerov, 1997
 Cordilura richterae Ozerov & Krivosheina
 Cordilura rubifrontata (Becker, 1894)
 Cordilura ruficauda (Zetterstedt, 1838)
 Cordilura rufimana Meigen, 1826
 Cordilura sagittifera Gorodkov, 1974
 Cordilura scapularis Loew, 1869
 Cordilura setosa Loew, 1860
 Cordilura shatalkini Ozerov, 1997
 Cordilura sibirica Gorodkov, 1974
 Cordilura sifneri Ozerov, 2007
 Cordilura similis (Siebke, 1873)
 Cordilura socialis (Becker, 1894)
 Cordilura tarsalis (Malloch, 1923)
 Cordilura tartariana Ozerov, 2007
 Cordilura umbrosa (Loew, 1873)
 Cordilura unicolor (Loew, 1864)
 Cordilura ustulata Zetterstedt, 1838
 Cordilura variabilis Loew, 1876
 Cordilura varicornis Curran, 1929
 Cordilura varipes (Walker, 1849)
 Cordilura zaitzevi Gorodkov, 1974
 Cordilura zetterstedti (Gimmerthal, 1846)
 Cordylura volucricaput Walker, 1849
 † Cordilura exhumata Cockerell, 1916
 † Cordylura vetusta Heer, 1849

References

Further reading

External links

 

Scathophagidae
Articles created by Qbugbot
Schizophora genera